1994 Yokohama Marinos season

Review and events

League results summary

League results by round

Competitions

Domestic results

J.League

Suntory series

NICOS series

Emperor's Cup

J.League Cup

Player statistics

 † player(s) joined the team after the opening of this season.

Transfers

In:

Out:

Transfers during the season

In
Yoshiharu Ueno (from Waseda University)
Kensaku Ōmori (from Minamiuwa High School)

Out
Everton Nogueira (on June)

Awards
J.League Best XI: Masami Ihara

References

Other pages
 J. League official site
 Yokohama F. Marinos official site

Yokohama Marinos
Yokohama F. Marinos seasons